The Roman Catholic Diocese of Iguatu is a diocese located in the city of Iguatu in the Ecclesiastical province of Fortaleza in Brazil.

History
 January 28, 1961: Established as Diocese of Iguatu from the Diocese of Crateús and Metropolitan Archdiocese of Fortaleza

Bishops

 Bishop José Mauro Ramalho (1961.10.13 – 2000.07.26)
 Bishop Coadjutor José Doth de Oliveira (1991–2000)
 Bishop José Doth de Oliveira (2000.07.26 – 2009.01.07)
 Bishop João José da Costa, O. Carm. (2009.01.07 – 2014.11.05)
 Bishop Edson de Castro Homem (2015.05.06 – 2021.02.24)
 Bishop Geraldo Freire Soares, C.SS.R. (2022.05.04 – ...)

References

 GCatholic.org
 Catholic Hierarchy

Roman Catholic dioceses in Brazil
Christian organizations established in 1961
Iguatu, Roman Catholic Diocese of
Roman Catholic dioceses and prelatures established in the 20th century
1961 establishments in Brazil